"Tough" is a song written by Joe Leathers and Monty Criswell, and recorded by American country music artist Craig Morgan.   It was released in March 2007 as the second single from Morgan's album Little Bit of Life. The song peaked at number 11 on the US Billboard Hot Country Songs chart and at 76 on the Billboard Hot 100.

Content
The song is about a hardworking wife and mother who survives breast cancer, serving as an inspiration to her husband, who says, "There was a time / Back before she was mine / When I thought I was tough."

Music video
The video for "Tough" premiered on June 4, 2007. Directed by Peter Zavadil, it features Morgan singing the song in a dimly lit room by a window, alongside film clips of a woman depicting the events in the song.

Chart performance

Year-end charts

References

2007 singles
2006 songs
Craig Morgan songs
Music videos directed by Peter Zavadil
BBR Music Group singles
Song recordings produced by Keith Stegall
Songs written by Monty Criswell
Songs written by Joe Leathers